Borince is a village in the municipality of Bojnik, Serbia. According to the 2002 census, the village has a population of 45 people.
Approximately 200 years ago this village was inhabited by Albanians. A large number of them today live in Ferizaj, Gjilan, Peja and other settlements. All these Albanian families were forcibly expelled from their settlements by the Serbian occupiers.

Gallery

References

Populated places in Jablanica District